The 2018 season is Albirex Niigata Singapore FC's 15th consecutive season in the top flight of Singapore football  and in the S.League, having joined the S.League in 2004. Along with the S.League, the club will also compete in the Singapore Cup and the Singapore League Cup.  They are the defending champions in 2018.

Key Events

Pre-season

 On 28/11/2017, the team announced that they had renewed contract with Head Coach Kazuaki YOSHINAGA for the S.League 2018 season. 
 On 15/12/2017, the team announced that they has age restrictions imposed by the FAS for the new season.  Depending on the squad size (minimum of 19 players), they will have to make do with eight U-21 players, eight U-23 players and one player of any age.  This is excluding 2 Singapore U-23 players which they can sign.

Squad

S.League squad

Coaching staff

Transfer

Pre-season transfer

In

Out

Extension

Mid-season transfers

Trial

Friendly

Pre-Season Friendly

In-Season Friendly

Team statistics

Appearances and goals

Competitions

Overview

Singapore Premier League

Singapore Cup

Albirex Niigata won 3-0 on aggregate.

Albirex Niigata won 4-2 on aggregate.

See also 
 2017 Albirex Niigata Singapore FC season
List of unbeaten football club seasons

References

Albirex Niigata Singapore FC
Albirex Niigata Singapore FC seasons